Andoni Iraola Sagarna (born 22 June 1982) is a Spanish retired professional footballer who played as a right-back, currently manager of Rayo Vallecano.

Combative and with good passing skills, he spent the vast majority of his professional career with Athletic Bilbao, appearing in 510 competitive matches over 12 seasons.

Playing career

Club

Athletic Bilbao
Iraola was born in Usurbil, Gipuzkoa. A product of Athletic Bilbao's youth system at Lezama after joining from Antiguoko, he made his debut with the first team in the 2003–04 season, becoming an instant first choice while often taking penalties and free kicks. On 30 August 2003, he made his first La Liga appearance, starting in a 1–0 home loss against FC Barcelona, and his five goals in 30 appearances helped the team qualify for the UEFA Cup.

During his 12 seasons, Iraola never played in fewer than 30 league matches, scoring in all but one league campaign – like former club legend Aitor Larrazábal, who played as a left-back– while also helping the Basque side finish second in three Copa del Rey tournaments and the 2011–12 UEFA Europa League. On 28 January 2007, he netted twice in a 2–0 away win over neighbours Real Sociedad, who were finally relegated; Athletic narrowly avoided the drop, ranking in 17th position. He played his first cup final in 2009, a 4–1 loss to Barcelona at Mestalla in Valencia, and three years later helped them finish runners-up in both the domestic cup and the Europa League.

2012–13 marked the first year where Iraola failed to find the net in the league, but he continued to be the side's first-choice in his position as he featured in 35 games. His only goal of the season came on 24 August 2012 in a 6–0 home rout of HJK Helsinki in the playoff round of the UEFA Europa League (9–3 on aggregate).

Iraola renewed his contract with the club on 4 December 2013, keeping him at the San Mamés until 30 June 2015. In the 24th minute of his last league appearance against Villarreal CF  in May 2015, Aritz Aduriz offered him the taking of a penalty kick but he declined, so the former converted it instead; the two players then combined for Iraola to score from open play four minutes later. He captained the team in his last match, the 2015 Copa del Rey Final which was lost 3–1 to Barcelona.

New York City
On 16 June 2015, aged 33, Iraola moved abroad for the first time in his career, signing for Major League Soccer club New York City FC. He made his debut against Toronto FC at the Yankee Stadium on 12 July, playing the entirety of a 4–4 draw.

Iraola announced his retirement on 17 November 2016.

International
On 20 August 2008, Iraola was called by new Spain coach Vicente del Bosque for a friendly with Denmark, alongside teammate Fernando Amorebieta. He entered the pitch in the final 15 minutes of the 3–0 away victory, coming in as a substitute for Sergio Ramos.

On 29 March 2011, after nearly one and a half years without playing for the national team, Iraola started in a 3–1 defeat of Lithuania in Kaunas for the UEFA Euro 2012 qualifiers. He was due to make the cut for the final squad, but injury forced him out in favour of Atlético Madrid's Juanfran.

Iraola played on the Basque representative side for a full decade, having debuted late on in a 2–1 win over Uruguay on 27 December 2003.

Coaching career
Iraola was appointed manager of Cypriot club AEK Larnaca FC on 18 June 2018, succeeding compatriot Imanol Idiakez. He was sacked the following 14 January, after nearly two months without winning a single match.

On 10 July 2019, Iraola replaced departed Borja Jiménez at the helm of CD Mirandés, newly promoted to Segunda División. He took the team to the semi-finals of the Spanish Cup for the second time in their 92-year history, notably disposing of top-tier sides RC Celta de Vigo, Sevilla FC and Villarreal. On 21 July 2020, he left the club as his contract expired.

Iraola remained in the second division in August 2020, taking over from Paco Jémez at Rayo Vallecano. On 6 July 2021, after achieving promotion in the playoffs, he extended his contract until 2022. The following season, he again led a club to the last four of the national cup; it was the second time Rayo had achieved this, the first occasion coming 40 years earlier.

In February 2023, Iraola was approached by Leeds United of the Premier League, but was not given permission to leave the Campo de Fútbol de Vallecas.

Career statistics

Club

International

Managerial statistics

Honours

Player
Athletic Bilbao
Copa del Rey runner-up: 2008–09, 2011–12, 2014–15
Supercopa de España runner-up: 2009
UEFA Europa League runner-up: 2011–12

Manager
AEK Larnaca
Cypriot Super Cup: 2018

See also
List of Athletic Bilbao players (200+ appearances)
List of La Liga players (400+ appearances)

References

External links

1982 births
Living people
People from Usurbil
Spanish footballers
Footballers from the Basque Country (autonomous community)
Association football defenders
La Liga players
Segunda División B players
Tercera División players
Antiguoko players
CD Basconia footballers
Bilbao Athletic footballers
Athletic Bilbao footballers
Major League Soccer players
New York City FC players
Spain youth international footballers
Spain under-21 international footballers
Spain international footballers
Basque Country international footballers
Spanish expatriate footballers
Expatriate soccer players in the United States
Spanish expatriate sportspeople in the United States
Spanish football managers
Cypriot First Division managers
AEK Larnaca FC managers
La Liga managers
Segunda División managers
CD Mirandés managers
Rayo Vallecano managers
Spanish expatriate football managers
Expatriate football managers in Cyprus
Spanish expatriate sportspeople in Cyprus